Ramalingam Rohit (born 3 May 1992) is an Indian cricketer. He made his List A debut for Tamil Nadu in the 2016–17 Vijay Hazare Trophy on 6 March 2017. He made his Twenty20 debut for Tamil Nadu in the 2017–18 Syed Mushtaq Ali Trophy on 25 January 2018.

References

External links
 

1992 births
Living people
Indian cricketers
Tamil Nadu cricketers
Place of birth missing (living people)